A model minority is a minority demographic (whether based on ethnicity, race or religion) whose members are perceived as achieving a higher degree of socioeconomic success than the population average, thus serving as a reference group to outgroups. This success is typically measured relatively by educational attainment; representation in managerial and professional occupations; and household income, along with other socioeconomic indicators such as low criminality and high family/marital stability. The concept of model minority is associated with Asian Americans in the U.S. Many European countries have concepts of classism that stereotype ethnic groups in a similar manner.

The concept is controversial, as it has historically been used to suggest there is no need for government intervention in socioeconomic disparities between certain racial groups. This argument has most often been applied in America to contrast Asian Americans (particularly from East and some South Asian regions) and Jewish Americans against Black and Indigenous people, enforcing the idea that Asian and Jewish Americans are good law-abiding, productive citizens/immigrants, while promoting the stereotype that Indigenous people and African Americans are prone to crime and dependent on welfare.

Issues
The concept of a model minority is heavily associated with U.S. culture, because it is not extensively used outside of the United States. However, many European countries have concepts of classism that stereotype ethnic groups in a manner which is similar to the stereotype of the model minority. Generalized statistics, such as higher education attainment rate, high representation in white-collar professional and managerial occupations, and a higher household income than other racial groups in the United States are often cited in support of model-minority status.

A common misconception is that the affected communities typically take pride in being labeled as a model minority. However, the model minority stereotype is considered detrimental to relevant minority communities because it is used to justify the exclusion of such groups in the distribution of (public and private) assistance programs, and it is also used to understate or slight the achievements of individuals within that minority.

Furthermore, the notion of the model minority pits minority groups against one another through the implication that non-model groups are at fault for falling short of the model minority level of achievement and assimilation. The concept has been criticized by outlets such as NPR and EU Scream for potentially homogenizing the experiences of Asian communities on one side and Hispanics and African Americans on the other, despite the fact that individual groups experience racism in different ways. Critics also argue that the idea perpetuates the belief that any minority has the capability to economically rise without assistance because it ignores the differences between the history of Asian Americans and the history of African Americans, as well as the history of Hispanics, in the United States.

United States
One of the earliest uses of the term model minority was in the 9 January 1966 edition of The New York Times Magazine by sociologist William Petersen to describe Asian Americans as ethnic minorities which, despite their marginalization, have achieved success in the United States. In his essay titled "Success Story: Japanese American Style", he wrote that the Japanese cultures have strong work ethics and family values which, consequently, lift them above "problem minorities". Petersen believed that the success of Asian Americans paralleled the success of Jewish Americans. A similar article about Chinese Americans was published in U.S. News & World Report in December 1966.

Asian Americans 
Although the term was first coined to describe the socioeconomic success of Japanese Americans, "model minority" eventually evolved to become associated with American Jews and Asian Americans in general, more specifically with East Asians (Japanese, Chinese, and Korean Americans) and Indian Americans or South Asians. By the 1980s, almost all major U.S. magazines and newspapers printed success stories of Asian Americans. Racial attacks were reported since the early 1980s.

Some scholars have described the creation of the model minority theory as a partial response to the emergence of the civil rights movement, in which African Americans fought for equal rights and the discontinuation of racial segregation in the United States. In reaction to the success of the movement, white America, citing the accomplishments of Asian Americans, argued that African Americans could raise their communities up by focusing on education and accepting and conforming to the racial segregation, institutional racism and discrimination which were all being practiced at that time. At that time however, Asian Americans were also marginalized and racially segregated, which meant that they also represented lower economic levels and faced the same social issues which other racial and ethnic minorities faced. Possible reasons as to why Asian Americans were used as this image of a model minority by White America include their smaller population; the view that Asian Americans were less of a "threat" to White America than African Americans were due to their general lack of political activism against racism; the success of their numerous (mostly small) businesses which operated in their segregated communities; and the fact that Chinese, Japanese, and Filipino Americans all made the national average which meant that the level of education which they obtained equalled the level of education which most Whites obtained at that time.

A few years after The New York Times Magazine article about Asian Americans being the model minority was published, Asian Americans formed their own movement, in which they fought for their own equal rights and the resolution of their own specific social issues. It would be modeled after the Civil Rights Movement, thus, it would effectively challenge White America and the social construct of racial discrimination.

Those who resisted the emergent stereotype in the 1960s–1980s could not gain enough support to combat it due to its so-called "positive" connotations. At the time, this led many, even within the Asian American community, to either view it as a welcomed label in contrast to years of negative stereotypes, or view it as a euphemistic stereotype that was no more than a mere annoyance. Many believe that the stereotype comes with more positives than negatives. In contrast, many critics believe that there are just as many negatives as there are positives, or they believe that stereotypes should never be regarded as "good," no matter how "positive" they are intended to be. Scientific studies have revealed that both socially and psychologically, positive stereotypes have many negative and damaging consequences. According to Marita Etcubañez, a director of Asian Americans Advancing Justice - Los Angeles, misconceptions about Asian Americans have an effect on government policy, as "politicians won't talk about our community's needs if they assume people don't require assistance." According to Yanan Wang writing for the Washington Post, since the 1960s, "the idea that Asian Americans are distinct among minority groups and therefore immune to the challenges which are faced by other people of color is a particularly sensitive issue in the community, which has recently fought to reclaim its place in social justice conversations with movements like #ModelMinorityMutiny." In his paper, "Education and the Socialization of Asian Americans: A Revisionist Analysis of the 'Model Minority Thesis'", B. Suzuki, a researcher of multicultural and Asian American studies at University of Massachusetts Amherst, disagrees with how the media has portrayed Asian Americans. Explaining the sociohistorical background of the contemporary social system, Suzuki argues that the model minority stereotype is a myth.

Since the creation of the model minority stereotype, Asian Americans have exceeded White Americans in terms of their level of education, as well as many other racial and ethnic groups in American society. , Asian Americans as a whole have obtained the highest educational attainment level and the highest median household income of any racial and ethnic demographic in the country, a position which African immigrants, and their American-born offspring, have just started to outperform them in. These statistics vary among the Asian American population.

Statistics
There has been a significant change in the perceptions of Asian Americans. In as little as 100 years of American history, stereotypes of East Asian Americans have changed from them being viewed as poor uneducated laborers to being portrayed as a hard-working, well-educated, and upper-middle-class minority. Proponents of the model minority model erroneously assumed that Asian Americans' perseverance, strong work ethic, and general determination to succeed were extensions of their supposedly quiet natures, rather than common characteristics among most immigrants. Among South Asian Americans, an example of the model minority stereotype are phenomena such as the high rates of educational attainment and above average household incomes in the Indian American community. Although some Asian American subgroups including East Asians and South Asians are economically successful, other Asian American subgroups such as Southeast Asian Americans which include Hmong, Laotians, Cambodians, and Vietnamese, are less socioeconomically successful. Asian Americans have developed the greatest income inequality gap in comparison to major racial and ethnic groups in the U.S. The economic gap in the standard of living between higher- and lower-income Asians nearly doubled; the ratio of income earned by Asians at the 90th percentile to income earned by Asians at the 10th percentile increased from 6.1 to 10.7 between 1970 and 2016, respectively.

The model minority model also points to the percentage of Asian Americans at elite universities. Model minority proponents claim that while Asian Americans are only 5% of the U.S. population, they are over-represented at all these schools. Additionally, Asian Americans go on to win a high proportion of Nobel Prizes. Of the 20 American physicists to win a Nobel Prize in the 21st century, East Asian Americans, who represent less than 4% of the U.S. population, have won 15% of prizes. Additionally, three science Nobel prizes have been won by Indian-Americans. Asian American students are concentrated in a very small percentage of institutions, in only eight states (and half concentrated in California, New York and Texas). Moreover, as more Asian Americans become Americanized and assimilated, more Asian American students are beginning to attend two-year community colleges (363,798 in 2000) than four-year public universities (354,564 in 2000), and this trend of attending community college is accelerating. West Coast academic institutions are amongst those that have the highest concentrations of Asian Americans.

The most highly educated group of Asian immigrants are Taiwanese. Education rates of Southeast Asians are low, but these numbers can be considered misleading, as a large percent comes from adult immigrants who came to the United States without any college education due to war. For ages 25 to 34, 45% of Vietnamese Americans have a bachelor's degree or higher compared to 39% of Non-Hispanic Whites.

Due to the impacts of the model minority stereotype, unlike other minority-serving institutions, Asian American Pacific Islander-serving institutions (AAPISI) did not receive federal recognition until 2007, with the passage of the College Cost Reduction and Access Act, which federally recognized the existence of AAPISIs, making them eligible for federal funding and designation as minority serving institutions. According to the Federal Bureau of Investigation's 2003 report Crime in the United States, Asian Americans have the lowest total arrest rates despite a younger average age, and high family stability.

South Asian Americans
The model minority label also includes South Asian communities, in particular, Indian Americans, because of their high aggregate socioeconomic success. According to the census report on Asian Americans issued in 2004 by the U.S. Census Bureau, 64% of Indian Americans had a bachelor's degree or higher, the second highest for all national origin groups. In the same census, 60% of Indian Americans had management or professional jobs, compared with a national average of 33%. Indian Americans, along with Japanese and Filipino Americans, have some of the lowest poverty rates for all communities, as well as one of the lowest rates of single parent households (7%, versus the national average of 15%). Indian Americans also earn the highest average income out of all national origin/ethnic groups. This has resulted in several stereotypes such as that of the "Indian Doctor".

It should however be noted that there are still pockets of poverty within the community, with around 8% classified as living in poverty.

Southeast Asian Americans 
Arguably, the model minority stereotype masks the socioeconomic under performance of other Asian American subgroups and the experiences of Southeast Asian American populations in the U.S. serve to refute the model minority stereotype. For context, Southeast Asian Americans consist of several ethnic groups, including Burmese, Vietnamese, Hmong, Laotian, and Cambodian.

An empirical literature review shows that most of the existing data used to justify the model minority image regarding Asian American academic achievement is aggregated. As a result, this data ignores important differences among individual Asian ethnic groups. Although many Asian Americans have succeeded academically and socioeconomically, survey research shows that recent immigrant groups, such as Southeast Asians, have been unable to replicate such success.

According to the 2010 U.S. Census, the overall percentage of people 25 years and older with less than a high school education in the U.S. population is 15%, whereas Asian Americans, as an aggregate, are close at 11.1%. However, disparities exist when comparing South Asian Americans and East Asian Americans with Southeast Asian Americans. For example, only 13.6% of Chinese Americans, 4.0 Japanese Americans, and 6.0% of South Asian Americans ages 25 years or older have less than a high school education.  In contrast, Southeast Asian Americans more than double the South Asian American and East Asian American percentages with 38.5% of Cambodian Americans, 39.6% of Hmong Americans, 34.3% of Lao Americans, and 51.1% of Vietnamese Americans ages 25 and over holding less than a high school education.

Moving on to higher education, the 2010 U.S. Census shows that 52% of Asian Americans ages 25 and over hold a bachelor's degree or higher, which is higher than the national American average of 29.9%. In contrast, the percentage of individuals aged 25 and over holding a bachelor's degree or higher amongst Southeast Asian American groups is much lower with only 44.4% of Filipino Americans and 21.2% of Vietnamese Americans falling within the aforementioned educational bounds. With the exception of Vietnamese Americans, Southeast Asian American representation in higher education is lower than other racial minorities, including African Americans (14.2%) and Latino Americans (10.3%). As cited in an empirical literature review, research that lacks differentiation between the varying Asian ethnic groups may mask under-performing groups as the higher performing groups raise the average. As a result, Southeast Asian American students are often overlooked due to the overwhelming success of their East and South Asian American peers.

As cited in a case study, many deficits of Southeast Asian American students' academic achievement can be attributed to the structural barriers of living in an immigrant household. Many Southeast Asian American students are children of refugees from countries at war. While the parents of Southeast Asian American students may have escaped death and persecution from their homelands, they often arrive in the US with fragmented families. As a result, refugees often lack resources, which causes them to not only rely on government assistance, but to also be placed in low-income communities near poorly funded schools. Additionally, families frequently have little to no understanding of the U.S. school system. Thus, Southeast Asian students are at a disadvantage as they have to quickly adjust to the new school system, while also keeping up with native-born students.

However, certain Southeast Asian ethnic groups have shown greater progress than others within the regional group and resemble the success of other more established Asian Americans. As cited in a case study, Vietnamese American students are beginning to show comparable rates of academic success to East Asian American students. Furthermore, among Southeast Asian American students, Vietnamese American students are recognized as having the highest academic performance, whereas Cambodian American students have the poorest performance. Although Cambodian and Vietnamese refugees endured similar immigration hardships, the aforementioned differences in academic success is attributed to structural and cultural factors. Another factor which may have an influence on Vietnamese American success is that the majority of 21st century Vietnamese immigrants to the United States are from non-refugee backgrounds, dissimilar from earlier migration patterns.

Despite this progress amongst Southeast Asian American students, the subgroup still struggles economically. Similar to data on academic achievement, information regarding Asian American's economic prospects is frequently aggregated and thus hides the diversity of economic struggles amongst subgroups like Southeast Asian Americans. For example, the poverty rate for the Asian American aggregate is 12.6%, which is similar to the United States' overall poverty rate of 12.4%. However, between the Japanese American subgroup and the Hmong American subgroup, there is a 28% difference in poverty rates. Whereas Japanese Americans fall below the average poverty rate at 10%, Hmong Americans face a poverty rate of 38%. The high poverty rate amongst Hmong Americans places the group in one of the highest poverty brackets within the United States. Hmong Americans, more so men than women, have also been disproportionately racialized and criminalized via gangster stereotyping. Additionally, median income levels differ amongst Asian American subgroups in which Southeast Asian Americans represent a disproportionate amount of low annual median incomes. This is illustrated by research in which Hmong Americans and Cambodian Americans earn an annual median income of $40,000 in comparison to Indian American and Filipino American families who earn an annual median income of around $60,000. By analyzing the individual economic data of Asian American subgroups, it becomes evident that the model minority stereotype, which puts forth the notion of Asian Americans achieving higher levels socioeconomic success, may be misleading.

Media portrayal
Media coverage of the increasing success of Asian Americans as a group began in the 1960s, reporting high average test scores and marks in school, winning national spelling bees, and high levels of university attendance.

In 1988, the writer Philip K. Chiu identified the prevalence of the model minority stereotype in American media reports on Chinese Americans, and noted the contrast between that stereotype and what he observed as the reality of the Chinese-American population, which was much more varied than the model minority stereotype in the media typically presented.

Effects of the stereotype 
According to Gordon H. Chang, the reference to Asian Americans as model minorities has to do with the work ethic, respect for elders, and high valuation of education, family and elders present in their cultures. The model minority stereotype also comes with an underlying notion of their apoliticality. Such a label one-dimensionalizes Asian Americans as having only traits based around stereotypes and no other human qualities, such as vocal leadership, negative emotions (e.g. anger or sadness), sociopolitical activeness, risk taking, ability to learn from mistakes, desire for creative expression, intolerance towards oppression or being overlooked of their acknowledgements and successes. Asian Americans are labeled as model minorities because they have not been as much of a "threat" to the U.S. political establishment as blacks, due to a smaller population and less political advocacy. This label seeks to suppress potential political activism through euphemistic stereotyping.

Another effect of the stereotype is that American society may tend to ignore the racism and discrimination Asian Americans still face. Complaints are dismissed with the claim that the racism which occurs to Asian Americans is less important than or not as bad as the racism faced by other minority races, thus establishing a systematic racial hierarchy. Believing that due to their success and that they possess so-called "positive" stereotypes, many assume they face no forms of racial discrimination or social issues in the greater American society, and that their community is fine, having "gained" social and economic equality.

Racial discrimination can take subtle forms such as through microaggression. The stereotyping of Asian Americans as a model minority and perfidious foreigner influences people's perceptions and attitudes towards Asians and also negatively affects students' academic outcomes, relationships with others, and psychological adjustments. For instance, discrimination and model minority stereotyping are linked to Asian American students' lower valuing of school, lower self-esteem, and higher depressive symptoms. Furthermore, the psychological distress of failing to meet the model minority image, such as feelings of inadequacy, self-doubt, shame, and embarrassment, is exacerbated due to the differential treatment associated with being stereotyped as a model minority and perpetual foreigner.

Furthermore, the model minority image can be a threat to underachieving Asian American students' academic experience and educational advancement. It promotes invisibility and disguises the academic barriers and psychological problems students may encounter. This is problematic because it creates a barrier for educators to better understand and assist struggling students' educational and mental health needs in order to optimize students' academic experience and social emotional development.

Asian Americans may also be commonly stereotyped by the general public as being studious, intelligent, successful, elitist, brand name conscious, yet paradoxically passive. As a result, Asian Americans have felt as though they have higher and unreasonable expectations due to their race. Also due to the model minority image, Asian American students are viewed as "problem-free" and academically competent students who can succeed with little support and without special services. This emphasis that Asian Americans are being denial by their racial reality because of the assumption that "Asians are the new Whites"; therefore, they are being dismissed by their intelligence and experiences. Thus, educators may overlook the instructional needs and psychological concerns of underachieving Asian American students. The model minority stereotype can also contribute to teachers' having a "blaming the victims" perspective. This means that teachers blame students, their culture, or their families for students' poor performance or misbehavior in school. This is problematic because it shifts responsibility away from schools and teachers and misdirects attention away from finding a solution to improve students' learning experience and alleviate the situation. Furthermore, the model minority stereotype has a negative impact on the home environment. Parents' expectations place high pressure on students to achieve, creating a stressful, school-like home environment. Parents' expressed worry and frustration can also place emotional burdens and psychological stress on students.

Another result of Asian American's regarded as a model minority is limiting the amount of accepted applicants to certain colleges.

Some educators hold Asian students to a higher standard. This deprives those students with learning disabilities from being given attention that they need. The connotations of being a model minority mean Asian students are often labeled with the unpopular "nerd" or "geek" image. Asians have been the target of harassment, bullying, and racism from other races due to the racially divisive model minority stereotype. The higher expectations placed on East Asians as a result of the model minority stereotype carries over from academics to the workplace.

The model minority stereotype is emotionally damaging to many Asian Americans, since there are unjustified expectations to live up to stereotypes of high achievement. The pressures from their families to achieve and live up to the model minority image have taken a tremendous mental and psychological toll on young Asian Americans. The model minority stereotype also influences Asian American students' psychological outcomes and academic experience. The model minority image can lead underachieving Asian American students to minimize their own difficulties and experience anxiety or psychological distress about their academic difficulties. Asian American students also have more negative attitudes toward seeking academic or psychological help due to fear of shattering the high expectations of teachers, parents, and classmates.

Overall, the model minority stereotype has negative effects on underachieving Asian students in both their home and school settings. It is a threat to Asian American students' academic experience and can disguise students' educational and mental health needs. Psychological distress from model minority stereotyping is related to the stressors associated with the pressure to succeed, differential treatment, and embarrassment or shame to seek help. With this information, a recommendation for schools is to promote a more inclusive and less competitive learning environment, so students will not be ashamed and afraid to ask for help. Administrators can also improve school climate by monitoring incidents of racial harassment and discrimination. Additionally, to better address struggling students' educational and mental health needs, educators can regularly check in with students and engage in culturally responsive teaching, aimed to understand students' unique circumstances and educational needs.

Possible causes of model minority status

Selective immigration
One possible cause of the higher performance of Asian Americans as a group is that they represent a small population in America so those who are chosen to move to America often come from a selective group of Asians. The relative difficulty of emigrating and immigrating into the United States has created a selective nature of the process with the U.S. often choosing the wealthier and more highly educated out of those with less resources, motivation or ability to immigrate.

Asian Americans are the nation's fastest growing ethnic group due to their high rate of immigration. 59% of all Asian Americans are foreign born. The majority of Asian Americans are either 1st or 2nd generation immigrants, with the Asian-American population increasing from only 980,000 in 1960 to 22.4 million in 2019. Due to their high rate of immigration, the Asian American population nearly doubled from 11.9 to 22.4 million in the period between 2000 and 2019 – an 88% increase. For reference, the Black population grew by 20% during this span, while there was virtually no change in the White population.

Asia is a much larger pool of skilled workers as the continent has 4.2 billion people, 60% of the world population. This far outnumbers the next two most populous continents of Africa (15% total world population) and Europe (10%). 82% of Asian American workers in STEM fields were foreign born, as well as 81% of the entirety of the Asian workforce.

In 2016, Indian and Chinese nationals accounted for 82% of all issued H1-B Visas, a work permit that allows skilled foreign workers to go to the United States and work for American companies.

As of May 2016, 77% of the 1.2 million international students enrolled in the United States hailed from Asia.

Cultural differences
Cultural factors are thought to be part of the reason why East Asian Americans are successful in the United States. East Asian societies often place more resources and emphasis on education. For example, Confucian tenets and Chinese culture places great value on work ethic and the pursuit of knowledge. In traditional Chinese social stratification, scholars were ranked at the top—well above businessmen and landowners. This view of knowledge is evident in the modern lifestyle of many East Asian American families, where the whole family puts emphasis on education and parents will make it their priority to push their children to study and achieve high marks. Similar cultural tendencies and values are found in South Asian American families, whose children similarly face extra pressure by parents to succeed in school and to achieve high-ranked jobs. Although pressure is often perceived as a way to help East Asian American descendants achieve greater success, it can be used as a way to provide better income and living status for families. In other words, much of the East Asian American success in the United States can be due to the stereotypical yet favorable characteristics that their background holds. In most cases, East Asians such as Chinese, Japanese, Korean, and Taiwanese Americans hold a high position in terms of successful educational goals.

Others counter this notion of culture as a driving force, as it ignores immigration policies. In the mid-1800s, Asian immigrants were recruited in the United States as laborers for agriculture and to aid in the building of the first transcontinental railroad. Many worked for low wages in the harshest conditions. Confucian values were not seen as a key to success. It was only until the Immigration and Nationality Act of 1965 changed the way Asians were seen, as Asians with higher education backgrounds were selectively chosen from a larger pool of the Asian population.

Further, it has also been argued the myth of the Confucian emphasis on education is counterfactual. It also implies Asians are a monolithic group, and ignores the fact that the most educated group of Asian immigrants in the U.S. are Indians, for whom Confucius is virtually non-existent in their upbringing. It has also been argued that self-selecting immigrants do not represent the actual Asian American population as a whole, nor the populations of their home countries. While 50% of Chinese immigrants in the U.S. have a bachelor's degree, only 5% of the population does in their native China. Lastly, if Confucian culture played a vital part of Asian culture, Chinese immigrant children would perform consistently around the world, yet second-generation Chinese immigrants in Spain are the lowest academic achievers among immigrant groups in the country, and less than half are expected to graduate from middle school.

Asian American status in affirmative action

In the 1980s, one Ivy League school found evidence it had limited admissions of Asian American students. Because of their high degree of success as a group and over-representation in many areas such as college admissions, most Asian Americans are not granted preferential treatment by affirmative action policies as are other minority groups.

Some schools choose lower-scoring applicants from other racial groups over Asian Americans in an attempt to promote racial diversity and to maintain some proportion to the society's racial demographics. In 2014, American business schools began a process to sort candidates based on their country of origin and region of the world they come from.

African Americans 
Often overlooked is the direct contrast of model minorities with African Americans. It is the opinion of some that model minority stereotypes have historically been utilized to discredit African American racial equality movements, such as the civil rights movement, as they highlighted an alternative route to racial reform. Instead of protesting, African Americans were pushed to follow the lead of Asian Americans, the model minority, who highlighted that success as a minority was possible through hard work and support of the government. Since the success of Asian Americans was frequently attributed to distinctive cultural elements, researchers and policymakers argued that the struggles faced by African Americans was the result of a "culture of poverty". Thus, politicians such as Assistant Secretary of Labor Daniel Patrick Moynihan suggested that fostering cultural change amongst African Americans was essential to address the overall issue of racial inequality. This is illustrated through Moynihan's paper, "The Negro Family: The Case for National Action", which argues for the need to intervene in African American families in order to establish familial values similar to those of Asian Americans.

While scholars of the civil rights era relied on cultural values to describe the varying successes of Asian Americans and African Americans, contemporary scholars have begun to examine the effects of the different types of racism the two ethnic groups experience. Essentially, racism in itself is not monolithic. Instead, it is perpetrated in different ways and different avenues of life in which anti-Black rhetoric often proves to be more harmful to Black personhood than situations involving anti-Asian discrimination. Such generalizations regarding Black peoples' inability to thrive in the United States fail to explain the high levels of success seen by Black African and Caribbean immigrants to America which surpasses the averages of all native-born American ethnic groups. Additionally, Black African immigrant women make up the highest paid group of women in country.

African immigrants as the invisible model minority 
African immigrants and Americans born to African immigrants have been described as an "Invisible Model Minority," primarily as a result of a high degree of success in the United States. Due to misconceptions and stereotypes, their success has not been acknowledged by the greater American society, as well as other Western societies, hence the label of "invisible". The invisibility of the success of Africans was touched upon by Dr. Kefa M. Otiso, an academic professor from Bowling Green State University, who stated that, "because these immigrants come from a continent that is often cast in an unfavorable light in the U.S. media, there is a tendency for many Americans to miss the vital contribution of these immigrants to meeting critical U.S. domestic labor needs, enhancing American global economic and technological competitiveness."

Education
In the 2000 U.S. census, it was revealed that African immigrants were the most educated immigrant group in the United States even when compared to Asian immigrants. Some 48.9% of all African immigrants hold a college diploma. This is more than double the rate of native-born white Americans, and nearly four times the rate of native-born African Americans. According to the 2000 Census, the rate of college diploma acquisition is highest among Egyptian Americans at 59.7%, followed closely by Nigerian Americans at 58.6%.

In 1997, 19.4% of all adult African immigrants in the United States held a graduate degree, compared to 8.1% of adult white Americans and 3.8% of adult Black Americans in the United States. According to the 2000 Census, the percentage of Africans with a graduate degree is highest among Nigerian Americans at 28.3%, followed by Egyptian Americans at 23.8%.

Of the African-born population in the United States age 25 and older, 87.9% reported having a high school degree or higher, compared with 78.8% of Asian-born immigrants and 76.8% of European-born immigrants, respectively. This success comes in spite of facts such as that more than 75% of the African foreign-born in the United States have only arrived since the 1990s and that African immigrants make up a disproportionately small percentage of immigrants coming to the United States such as in 2007 alone African immigrants made up only 3.7% of all immigrants in coming to the United States and again in 2009 they made up only 3.9% of all immigrants making this group a fairly recent to the United States diversity.

Of the 8% of students at Ivy League schools that are Black, a majority, about 50–66%, was made up of Black African immigrants, Caribbean immigrants, and American born to those immigrants. Many top universities report that a disproportionate of the Black student population consists of recent immigrants, their children, or were mixed race.

Socioeconomics
The overrepresentation of the highly skilled can be seen in the relatively high share of Black African immigrants with at least a four-year college degree. In 2007, 27 percent of the U.S. population aged 25 and older had a four-year degree or more; 10% had a master's, doctorate, or professional degree. Immigrants from several Anglophone African countries were among the best educated: a majority of Black Immigrants from Nigeria, Cameroon, Uganda, Tanzania, and Zimbabwe had at least a four-year degree. Immigrants from Egypt, where the official language is Arabic, were also among the best educated. The overrepresentation of the highly skilled among U.S. immigrants is particularly striking for several of
Africa's largest source countries. The United States was the destination for 59% of Nigeria's highly skilled immigrants along with 47% of those from Ghana and 29% from Kenya.

The average annual personal income of African immigrants is about $26,000, nearly $2,000 more than that of workers born in the U.S. This might be because 71% of the Africans 16 years and older are working, compared to 64% of Americans. This is believed to be due larger percentage of African immigrants have higher educational qualifications than Americans, which results in higher per capita incomes for African immigrants and Americans born to African immigrants.

Outside of educational success, specific groups have found economic success and have made many contributions to American society. For example, recent statistics indicate that Ugandan Americans have become one of the country's biggest contributors to the economy, their contribution, amounting to US$1 billion in annual remittances which are disproportionately large contributions despite a community and population of less than 13,000. African immigrants like many other immigrant groups are likely to establish and find success in small businesses. Many Africans that have seen the social and economic stability that comes from ethnic enclaves such as Chinatowns have recently been establishing ethnic enclaves of their own at much higher rates to reap the benefits of such communities. Examples of such ethnic enclaves include Little Ethiopia in Los Angeles and Le Petit Senegal in New York City.

Demographically, African Immigrants and Americans born of African immigrants tend to typically congregate in urban areas, moving to suburban areas over the next few generations as they try to acquire economic and social stability. They are also one of America's least likely groups to live in racially segregated areas. African Immigrants and Americans born of African immigrants have been reported as having some of the lowest crime rates in the United States and being one of the unlikeliest groups to go into or commit crime. African immigrants have even been reported to have lowered crime rates in neighborhoods in which they have moved into. 

Black immigrants from Black majority countries are, upon their arrival, revealed to be much healthier than Black people from countries that are not majority Black and where they constitute a minority. Thus, African immigrants are, after arriving, often much healthier than American-born Black people and Black immigrants from Europe, though there is some evidence that as they settle, their health declines to the levels of their native counterparts, suggesting racial discrimination may be a factor in poor health for these communities.

Cultural factors
Cultural factors have been proposed as an explanation for the success of African immigrants. For example, it is claimed they often integrate into American society more successfully and at higher rates than other immigrants groups due to social factors. One being that many African immigrants have strong English skills even before entering the U.S., many African nations, particularly former Commonwealth nations, use English as a lingua franca. Because of this, many African immigrants to the U.S. are bilingual. Overall, 70% of Black African immigrants either speak English as their primary language or speak another language but are also fluent in English. Compare this to 48% proficiency in English for other immigrant groups.

Kefa M. Otiso has proposed another reason for the success of African immigrants, saying that they have a "high work ethic, focus and a drive to succeed that is honed and crafted by the fact that there are limited socioeconomic opportunities in their native African countries," says Otiso.

Selective immigration
Another possible cause of the higher performance of African immigrants as a group is that they represent a small population in America so those who are chosen to come here often come from a selective group of African people. The relative difficulty of emigrating and immigrating into the United States has created a selective nature of the process with the U.S. often choosing the wealthier and more educated out of those with less resources, motivation or ability to immigrate.

Americans born to African immigrants

This pushing of second generation African immigrants by their parents has proven to be the key factor in their success, and a combination of family support and the emphasis of family unit has given these citizens social and psychological stability which makes them strive even further for success in many aspects of their daily life and society.

Many of these American groups have thus transplanted high cultural emphasis on education and work ethic into their cultures which can be seen in the cultures of Algerian Americans, Kenyan Americans, Sierra Leonean Americans, Ghanaian Americans, Malawian Americans, Congolese Americans, Tanzanian Americans, and especially Nigerian Americans and Egyptian Americans. Though this fails to explain why poverty, corruption, violence, ethnic conflict, and generally poor socioeconomic conditions continue to plague African nations such as Nigeria.

Caribbean Americans 
In 2017, there were approximately 4.4 million Caribbean immigrants in the US. Overall, there are over 8 million people of Caribbean heritage. Cubans, Dominicans, Jamaicans, Haitians, Trinidadians and Tobagonians are the largest groups. Caribbeans are likely to be employed at the same rate as the general immigrant population and at a higher rate than native born Americans. According to a report in the International Business Times, Caribbean immigrants perform better than the general immigrant population in terms of high school graduation rates and some socio-economic indicators. In comparison to other immigrant groups, Caribbeans are far more likely to be naturalised American citizens, display a better standard of English and have higher rates of health insurance cover. Studies by Harvard sociologist Robert Sampson suggest Caribbean immigrants are associated with low crime rates. According to a report drawn from Immigration Studies (CIS), various Caribbean communities are among the top immigrant homeowners in America. The non-Hispanic Caribbean community tend to earn more than the American average. In 2018, their median household income was $57, 339 compared to the American average of $54, 689. In 2019, the figure was $60, 997 compared to the American average of $57, 761 (US Census Bureau 2018 and 2019). Caribbeans make up the majority of America's Black immigrant population (46%). Black immigrants significantly contribute to the U.S. economy, with a spending power of $98 billion in 2018. Black immigrants earned approximately $133.6 billion and paid $36 billion in US taxes. These successes are primarily why some Caribbean Americans have been described as a model minority.

Cuban success story

The Cuban success story is a popular myth that Cuban Americans are all political exiles who have become wealthy in the United States. This story is often used to prove the accessibility of the American dream.

Commonwealth countries

Africans 
African immigrants have experienced success in numerous countries especially Commonwealth countries such as Canada, Australia and the United Kingdom, which have attracted many educated and highly skilled African immigrants with enough resources for them to start a new life in these countries.

In the United Kingdom, one report has revealed that African immigrants have high rates of employment and that African immigrants are doing better economically than some other immigrant groups. Africans have obtained much success as entrepreneurs, many owning and starting many successful businesses across the country. Of the African immigrants, certain groups have become and are highly integrated into the country especially groups which have strong English language skills such as Zimbabweans or Nigerians, and they often come from highly educated and highly qualified backgrounds. Many African immigrants have low levels of unemployment, and some groups are known for their high rates of self-employment, as can be seen in the case of Nigerian immigrants. Certain groups outside of having strong English skills have found success mostly because many who immigrated to the UK are already highly educated and highly skilled professionals who come with jobs and positions such as business people, academics, traders, doctors and lawyers as is the case with Sudanese immigrants.

As of 2013, Nigerian immigrants were among the nine immigrant populations that were above average academically in the UK. Euromonitor International for the British Council suggests that the high academic achievement by Nigerian students is mainly from most of the pupils already having learned English in their home country. Additionally, many of them hail from the wealthier segments of Nigerian society, which can afford to pursue studies abroad. A notable example of the highly educated nature of British Nigerians is the case of Paula and Peter Imafidon, nine-year-old twins who are the youngest students ever to be admitted to high school in England. Nicknamed the 'Wonder Twins', the twins and other members of their family have accomplished incredible rare feats, passing advanced examinations and being accepted into institutions with students twice their age.

Asians 
In Canada, Asian Canadians are somewhat viewed as a model minority, though the phenomenon is not as widespread as it is in the United States. The majority of this is aimed toward the East Asian and South Asian communities.

In New Zealand, Asian New Zealanders are viewed as a model minority due to attaining above average socioeconomic indicators than the New Zealand average, though the phenomenon remains small, underground, and not as widespread compared with their American counterparts. In a study of a popular New Zealand newspaper, articles "never portrayed the Chinese as a model minority that silently achieves" and this was "not in line with overseas research, suggesting that this stereotype merits further analysis".

Israel 
In Israel, Christian Arabs are one of the most educated groups. Maariv has described the Christian Arab sectors as "the most successful in education system," since Christian Arabs fared the best in terms of education in comparison to any other group receiving an education in Israel. and they have attained a bachelor's degree and academic degree more than the median Israeli population.

Education 

According to the study "Are Christian Arabs the New Israeli Jews? Reflections on the Educational Level of Arab Christians in Israel" by Hanna David from the University of Tel Aviv, one of the factors why Israeli Arab Christians are the most educated segment of Israel's population is the high level of the Christian educational institutions. Christian schools in Israel are among the best schools in the country, and while those schools represent only 4% of the Arab schooling sector, about 34% of Arab university students come from Christian schools, and about 87% of the Israeli Arabs in the high tech sector have been educated in Christian schools. A 2011 Maariv article described the Christian Arab sector as "the most successful in the education system," an opinion supported by the Israel Central Bureau of Statistics and others who point out that Christian Arabs fared best in terms of education in comparison to any other group receiving an education in Israel.

High school and matriculation exams
The Israel Central Bureau of Statistics noted that when taking into account the data recorded over the years, Christian Arabs fared the best in terms of education in comparison to any other group receiving an education in Israel. In 2016 Christian Arabs had the highest rates of success at matriculation examinations, namely 73.9%, both in comparison to Muslim and Druze Israelis (41% and 51.9% respectively), and to the students from the different branches of the Hebrew (majority Jewish) education system considered as one group (55.1%).

Higher education
Arab Christians are one of the most educated groups in Israel. Statistically, Arab Christians in Israel have the highest rates of educational attainment among all religious communities, according to a data by Israel Central Bureau of Statistics in 2010, 63% of Israeli Arab Christians have had college or postgraduate education, the highest of any religious and ethno-religious group. Despite the fact that Arab Christians only represent 2.1% of the total Israeli population, in 2014 they accounted for 17.0% of the country's university students, and for 14.4% of its college students. There are more Christians who have attained a bachelor's degree or higher academic degrees than the median Israeli population.

The rate of students studying in the field of medicine was higher among Arab Christian students than that of all other sectors. and the percentage of Arab Christian women who are receiving higher education is also higher than that of other groups.

In 2013, Arab Christian students were also the vanguard in terms of eligibility for higher education, as the Christian Arab students had the highest rates of receiving Psychometric Entrance Test scores which eligible them to be accepted into universities, data from the Israel Central Bureau of Statistics show that 61% of Christian Arabs were eligible for university studies, compared to 50% of Jewish, 45% of Druze, and 35% of Muslim students.

Socio-economic 
In terms of their socio-economic situation, Arab Christians are more similar to the Jewish population than to the Muslim Arab population. They have the lowest incidence of poverty and the lowest percentage of unemployment which is 4.9% compared to 6.5% among Jewish men and women. They have also the highest median household income among Arab citizens of Israel and second highest median household income among the Israeli ethno-religious groups. Also Arab Christians have a high presentation in science and in the white-collar professions. In Israel Arab Christians are portrayed as a hard working and upper middle class educated ethno-religious minority.

Mexico
Due to their business success and cultural assimilation, German Mexicans and Lebanese Mexicans are seen as model minorities in Mexico. More recently, Haitians in Tijuana have been seen favorably by Tijuanenses as model immigrants due to their work ethic and integration into Tijuana society, and have been contrasted with Central American migrants.

In the 19th and early 20th century, German immigration was encouraged due to the perceived industriousness of Germans. German Mexicans were instrumental in the development of the cheese and brewing industries in Mexico. Germans in the Soconusco were successful in the coffee industry.

Although Lebanese Mexicans made up less than 5% of the total immigrant population in Mexico during the 1930s, they constituted half of the immigrant economic activity. Carlos Slim, one of the richest individuals in the world, is the topmost example of Lebanese Mexican success.

Egypt

Egyptian Copts 

In Egypt, Copts have relatively higher educational attainment, relatively higher wealth index, and a stronger representation in white collar job types, but limited representation in security agencies. The majority of demographic, socioeconomic and health indicators are similar among Copts and Muslims. Historically; many Copts were accountants, and in 1961 Coptic Christians owned 51% of the Egyptian banks. A Pew Center study about religion and education around the world in 2016, found that around 36% of Egyptian Christians obtain a university degree in institutions of higher education.

According to the scholar Andrea Rugh Copts tend to belong to the educated middle and upper-middle class, and according to scholar Lois Farag "The Copts still played the major role in managing Egypt's state finances. They held 20% of total state capital, 45% of government employment, and 45% of government salarie". According to scholar J. D. Pennington 45% of the medical doctors, 60% of the pharmacists of Egypt were Christians.

A number of Coptic business and land-owning families became very wealthy and influential such as the Egyptian Coptic Christian Sawiris family that owns the Orascom conglomerate, spanning telecommunications, construction, tourism, industries and technology. In 2008, Forbes estimated the family's net worth at $36 billion. According to scholars Maristella Botticini and Zvi Eckstein argue that Copts have relatively higher educational attainment and relatively higher wealth index, due to Coptic Christianity emphasis on literacy and that Coptic Christianity encouraged the accumulation of human capital.

France

Anti-racist activism
According to the French antiracist activist Grace Ly, the model minority myth is associated with the South-East Asian community in France.
Ly denounces the positive stereotypes associated with the Asian community in France in her book Model Young Girl (Jeune fille modèle).

French Vietnamese
The Vietnamese in France are the most well-established overseas Vietnamese community outside eastern Asia, as well as Asian ethnic group in France, with roughly 139,000 Vietnamese immigrants living in France. While the level of integration among immigrants and their place in French society have become prominent issues in France in the past decade, French media and politicians generally view the Vietnamese community as a model minority. This is in part because they are represented as having a high degree of integration within French society, in addition to their economic and academic success. A survey in 1988 asking French citizens which immigrant ethnic group they believe to be the most integrated in French society saw the Vietnamese ranked fourth, behind only the Italian, Spanish and Portuguese communities.

The educational attainment rate of the Vietnamese population in France is the highest among overseas Vietnamese populations, a legacy that dates back to the colonial era of Vietnam, when privileged families and those with connections to the colonial government often sent their children to France to study. In addition to high achievement in education, the Vietnamese population in France is also largely successful economically. When the first major wave of Vietnamese migrants arrived in France during World War I, a number of migrants already held professional occupations in their new country shortly after their arrival. More recently, refugees who arrived in France after the Fall of Saigon are often more financially stable than their counterparts who settled in North America, Australia and the rest of Europe, due to better linguistic and cultural knowledge of the host country, which allowed them to enter the education system and/or higher paying professions with little trouble. Within a single generation, the median income for French-born Vietnamese has risen above the French median income.

French Laotians
Similarly to the Vietnamese, the Laotian community in France is one of the most well-integrated into the country and is the most established overseas Laotian populace. Unlike their counterparts in North America and Australia, Laotians in France have a high rate of educational success and are well-represented in the academic and professional sectors, especially among the generations of French-born Lao. Due to better linguistic and cultural knowledge of the host country, Laotian immigrants to France, who largely came as refugees after the end of the Laotian Civil War, were able to assimilate at a high rate.

Germany

In Germany the academic success of people of Vietnamese origin has been called "Das vietnamesische Wunder"("The Vietnamese Miracle"). A study revealed that in the Berlin districts of Lichtenberg and Marzahn, both in former East Berlin and possessing a relatively small percentage of immigrants, Vietnamese account for only 2% of the general population, but make up 17% of the prep school population. Another note of Vietnamese Germans' academic success is that even though they can grow up in poverty in places like East Germany, they usually outperform their peers by a wide margin.

Another group in Germany that is extremely academically successful and is comparable to that of a model minority are Korean Germans, 70% of whom attended a Gymnasium (which is comparable to a prep school in American society), compared to Vietnamese Germans with only 50% attending a Gymnasium. Also, over 70% of second-generation Korean Germans hold at least an Abitur or higher educational qualification, more than twice the ratio of the rest of Germany.

Burma

In Burma, Gurkhas of Nepali descent are viewed as a model minority. Gurkhas place a high importance on education, and they represent a disproportionately high share of those with advanced (medical, engineering or doctorate) degrees in Burma.

People's Republic of China

The People's Republic of China is a multiethnic, multinational state, and the ruling Communist Party officially recognizes 55 ethnic groups within the borders controlled by the People's Republic. Since the foundation of the Chinese Communist Party, a dialectical materialist view of ethnic minorities has been a prominent party ideology, in which all ethnic groups of China are seen as equal. Nevertheless, certain minorities are widely seen as more "ideal" in terms of moral, economic, or cultural superiority, than the majority Han, for example, the Joseonjok, Zhuang, and Hui, who are seen as both proudly Korean, Zhuang, or Hui respectively, but also highly loyal to the Chinese nation.

Integration of other minorities

Notwithstanding the successes in integrating the Hui, the 21st century has seen the state confronted with ethnic tension with minority groups seen as less loyal, in particular the Tibetans and the Uighurs, where in both cases, violent reactions to attempts to integrate into the wider Chinese society has resulted in state repression.

Netherlands

Background

At the end of the colonial era of the Dutch East Indies (now: Indonesia), a community of about 300,000 Indo-Europeans (people of mixed Indonesian and European heritage) was registered as Dutch citizens. Indos formed the vast majority of the European legal class in the colony. When in the second half of the 20th century the independent Republic of Indonesia was established, the majority of Europeans, including the Indo-Europeans, were expelled from the newly established country.

Repatriation
From 1945 to 1949 the Indonesian National Revolution turned the former Dutch East Indies into an increasingly hostile environment for Indo-Europeans. Violence aimed towards Indo-Europeans during its early Bersiap period (1945–1946) accumulated in almost 20,000 deaths. The Indo diaspora continued up to 1964 and resulted in the emigration of practically all Indo-Europeans from a turbulent young Indonesian nation. Even though most Indos had never set foot in the Netherlands before, this emigration was named repatriation.

Notwithstanding the fact that Indos in the former colony of the Dutch East Indies were officially part of the European legal class and were formally considered to be Dutch nationals, the Dutch government practiced an official policy of discouragement with regard to the post-WWII repatriation of Indos to the Netherlands. While Dutch policy was in fact aimed at stimulating Indos to give up Dutch citizenship and opt for Indonesian citizenship, simultaneously the young Indonesian Republic implemented policies increasingly intolerant towards anything remotely reminiscent of Dutch influence. Even though actual aggression against Indos decreased after the extreme violence of the Bersiap period, all Dutch (language) institutions, schools and businesses were gradually eliminated and public discrimination and racism against Indos in the Indonesian job market continued. In the end 98% of the original Indo community repatriated to their distant fatherland in Europe.

Integration
In the 1990s and early 21st century the Netherlands was confronted with ethnic tension in a now multi-cultural society. Ethnic tensions, rooted in the perceived lack of social integration and rise of crime rates of several ethnic minorities, climaxed with the murders of politician Pim Fortuyn in 2002 and film director Theo van Gogh in 2004. In 2006 statistics show that in Rotterdam, the second largest city in the country, close to 50% of the inhabitants were of foreign descent. The Indo community however is considered the best integrated ethnic and cultural minority in the Netherlands. Statistical data compiled by the CBS shows that Indos belong to the group with the lowest crime rates in the country.

A CBS study of 1999 reveals that of all foreign born groups living in the Netherlands, only the Indos have an average income similar to that of citizens born in the Netherlands. Job participation in government, education and health care is similar as well. Another recent CBS study, among foreign born citizens and their children living in the Netherlands in 2005, shows that on average, Indos own the largest number of independent enterprises. A 2007 CBS study shows that already over 50% of first-generation Indos have married a native born Dutch person. A percentage that increased to 80% for the second generation. One of the first and oldest Indo organisations that supported the integration of Indo repatriates into the Netherlands is the Pelita foundation.

Although Indo repatriates, being born overseas, are officially registered as Dutch citizens of foreign descent, their Eurasian background puts them in the Western sub-class instead of the Non-Western (Asian) sub-class.

Two factors are usually attributed to the essence of their apparently seamless assimilation into Dutch society: Dutch citizenship and the amount of 'Dutch cultural capital', in the form of school attainments and familiarity with the Dutch language and culture, that Indos already possessed before migrating to the Netherlands.

New generations
Although third- and fourth-generation Indos are part of a fairly large minority community in the Netherlands, the path of assimilation ventured by their parents and grandparents has left them with little knowledge of their actual roots and history, even to the point that they find it hard to recognise their own cultural features. Some Indos find it hard to grasp the concept of their Eurasian identity and either tend to disregard their Indonesian roots or on the contrary attempt to profile themselves as Indonesian. In recent years however the reinvigorated search for roots and identity has also produced several academic studies.

See also

Bamboo ceiling
Barua (Bangladesh)
Bengali Christians
Dominant minority
Honorary whites
Honorary Aryan
Intergroup anxiety
John Henryism
Jewish stereotypes
Middleman minority
Minority stress
Overachievement
Parsis (India)
Race and intelligence
Stereotype threat
Tiger mother
World on Fire (book)

Notes

References

Bibliography
Ancheta, Angelo N. 2006. Race, Rights, and the Asian American Experience. Rutgers University Press. .
 
Chen, Edith Wen-Chu, and Grace J. Yoo. 2009. Encyclopedia of Asian American Issues Today 1. ABC-CLIO. .
 
Espiritu, Yen Le. 1996. Asian American Women and Men: Labor, Laws, and Love.
 
Hartlep, N. 2021. The Model Minority Stereotype: Demystifying Asian American Success (2nd edition). Information Age Publishing. .
Hartlep, N. 2013. The Model Minority Stereotype: Demystifying Asian American Success. Information Age Publishing. .
— 2014. The Model Minority Stereotype Reader: Critical and Challenging Readings for the 21st Century. Cognella Publishing. .
Hartlep, N., and B. J. Porfilio, eds. 2015. Killing the Model Minority Stereotype: Asian American Counterstories and Complicity. Information Age Publishing. .
 Hsu, Madeline Y. 2015. The Good Immigrants: How the Yellow Peril Became the Model Minority. Princeton University Press.
Li, Guofang, and Lihshing Wang. 2008. Model Minority Myth Revisited: an Interdisciplinary Approach to Demystifying Asian American Educational Experiences.  Information Age Publishing. .
Marger, Martin N. 2009. Race and Ethnic Relations: American and Global Perspectives (8th ed.). Cengage Brain. .
Min, Zhou and Carl L. Bankston III. 1998. Growing Up American: How Vietnamese Children Adapt to Life in the United States. Russell Sage Foundation.
Rothenberg, Paula S. 2006. Race, Class, and Gender in the United States: An Integrated Study (7th ed.). Macmillan. .
 Wu, Helen D. 2014. The Color of Success: Asian Americans and the Origins of the Model Minority. Princeton University Press.

External links
Survey Examines Asian Mobility, Stephen Klineberg's systematic survey of Houston's Asian community
Asian-Nation: The Model Minority Image, by C.N. Le, Ph.D.
A Brief History of the Model Minority Stereotype, by Andrew Chin
Yellow: Race in America Beyond Black and White, by Frank H. Wu
Model Minority Stereotype Project Bibliography
Will American Science Stay On Top?, by Pratik Chougule

Anti-racism
Asian-American issues
Ethnic and racial stereotypes
Minorities
Race and intelligence controversy
Social groups
Social inequality